Thai royal funerals are elaborate events, organised as royal ceremonies akin to state funerals. They are held for deceased members of the Royal Family, and consist of numerous rituals which typically span several months to over a year. Featuring a mixture of Buddhist and animist beliefs, as well as Hindu symbolism, these rituals include the initial rites that take place after death, a lengthy period of lying-in-state, during which Buddhist ceremonies take place, and a final cremation ceremony. The practices date to at least the 17th century, during the time of the Ayutthaya Kingdom. Today, the cremation ceremonies are held in the royal field of Sanam Luang in the historic centre of Bangkok.

Overview

The main components of a royal funeral do not differ much from regular Thai funerals, which are based on Buddhist beliefs mixed with local animist traditions. Hindu symbolism, a long-standing feature of the monarchy, is also featured prominently. The kot is then placed on display and daily Buddhist rites—which include chants by Buddhist monks and the playing of ceremonial music every three hours—are held for an extended period, which today has come to signify lying-in-state in the Western sense. The body is brought to the cremation field in an elaborate procession featuring great funeral carriages, and days of theatrical performances are held.

There are many levels of royal funerals, depending on the rank and status of the deceased royal family member. The supreme patriarch and high-ranking Buddhist monks may also receive royal cremations similar to those of lesser royals.

While documentation of historic private rites are scarce, as they were passed on by oral tradition, royal cremation ceremonies have been documented since the Ayutthaya period, and have continued into the current Rattanakosin Kingdom. They were previously very elaborate and grand, but have been much simplified since the funeral of King Chulalongkorn (Rama V) in 1911.

Following the abolishment of absolute monarchy in 1932, King Prajadhipok (Rama VII) abdicated and died in England, and royal funerals became a rare occurrence, apart from that of King Ananda Mahidol (Rama VIII) in 1950 and Queen Sri Savarindira in 1956. The ceremony received somewhat of a revival in the funeral of Queen Rambai Barni (Prajadhipok's widow) in 1985. Royal cremations held since include those of Princess Mother Srinagarindra in 1996, Princess Galyani Vadhana in 2008, Princess Bejaratana in 2012, and King Bhumibol Adulyadej (Rama IX) in 2017.

Initial rituals and lying-in-state

Bathing ceremony and sukam sop
The bathing ceremony takes place shortly after death. Today, it is held in the Phiman Rattaya Throne Hall in the Grand Palace, and is attended by members of the Royal Family and senior government officials. As with common funerals today, this takes place as a ceremonial pouring of water by the attendees, but the water is usually poured over the deceased's feet instead of the hand, as is done for commoners. After the bathing ceremony, the hair is ritually combed, once upwards and once downwards, and the comb is broken. For high-ranking royals, a gold death mask is placed on the body (after sealing the orifices with wax, in times before embalming).

Next is the  ritual, i.e. the tying, wrapping and placing of the body in the kot. The body is first dressed in white, with the appropriate accessories. It is then ritually tied with undyed string, and wrapped in a white shroud. The body is finally placed in a foetal position in the kot. A chada (pointed crown) is ritually placed on the head of the body, before the lid of the kot is finally closed.

Kot

The kot (from Sanskrit kośa, meaning "container") is a large funerary urn, used to contain the body of the deceased in place of a coffin. It is used for royalty, as well as high-ranking members of the nobility. Today it may also be granted to high-ranking government officials. There are fourteen types of kot, which are granted to the deceased according to their rank and status. The highest-ranking kot, is reserved for the king and the highest-ranking royal family members.

A tube runs down from an opening at the base of the kot, connecting it to a jar hidden beneath the pedestal which serves to collect fluids, as the body was mostly allowed to decompose within the kot in the days before embalming. This often led to undesirable odours, which had to be masked by burning fragrant incenses.

The kot probably derived from the use of burial urns in ancient Southeast Asian traditions, which also featured secondary burials, comparable to the custom of waiting a certain period before cremation. Despite the Sanskrit origin of the term, such urns were not used by Medieval cultures of the Indian Subcontinent, from which the practice of cremation spread to Thailand, along with Buddhism.

During the funeral of Princess Mother Srinagarindra in 1995, the royal body was not physically placed in the kot, in accordance with her wishes. Instead, a coffin was used, placed behind the pedestal which still customarily bore the empty kot. The same was done for the funerals of Princess Galyani Vadhana and King Bhumibol, although Princess Bejaratana opted for her body to be placed in the kot according to tradition.

Daily rites

The kot, containing the body, is enshrined in the throne hall for a period of time (usually at least 100 days). In modern times, this has become analogous to lying-in-state, although the practice predates Western contact and did not originally serve to allow the public to pay their respects. Further Buddhist ceremonies are held to mark the 7th, 15th, 50th and 100th days since the death.

During these Buddhist rites, meal offerings (for morning and midday ceremonies) and offerings of cloth on behalf of the dead, known as sadappakon, are made to the monks.

While these rites were also historically private affairs, members of the public have been allowed to pay their respects in the Dusit Maha Prasat Throne Hall since the funeral of King Chulalongkorn, in recent funerals the main public vigils are also livestreamed.

Mourning

Historically, the kingdom's subjects had to shave their heads and dress in white to mourn the death of the king. This practice has also been abandoned since the funeral of King Chulalongkorn. The practice of wearing black for mourning was also a Western import introduced around the King's time.

Today, mourning mostly follows Western protocols. The government announces a mourning period to be observed by government officials, and national flags are flown at half-mast. Public entertainment activities is requested to be withheld for a certain period, and broadcast media also typically suspends entertainment programming as well. Mourning is again observed during the cremation period.

Preparation for cremation

Merumat and men

This is Sanam Luang in today's Rattanakosin period; its role as the site of royal cremations explains its former name, Thung Phra Men, which means "royal cremation field".

The construction of merumat for royal cremations date to the Ayutthaya period, as Hindu beliefs were absorbed from the Khmer Empire. Following the Hindu-Buddhist ideology of divine kingship, the king was believed to be semi-divine, and the merumat symbolizes Mount Meru, the centre of the universe atop which lies the home of the gods, to which the king would return after death.

The earliest merumat was probably erected during the reign of King Prasat Thong (1629–1656), and modelled after Angkor Wat. Ayutthaya-period merumat were gigantic structures. The one built for King Narai (died 1688) was recorded as being 3 sen (60 fathoms) tall—120 metres according to modern conversion rates. Despite the usual translation of merumat as "funeral pyre", it was actually a mainly decorative structure, within which the much smaller actual pyre was housed. Merumat were always temporary structures purpose-built for the ceremony, and featured the exquisite craftsmanship of the kingdom's best artisans.

The construction of the merumat often took months, if not years, to complete. This, along with the fact that the cremation had to take place in the dry season, partly contributed to the practice of waiting lengthy periods before cremation. Often, by the time a merumat or men was completed, it would be used for multiple cremations, as multiple royal deaths had occurred.

The practice of building very large merumat was last seen in the funeral of King Mongkut (Rama IV, died 1868). His successor, King Chulalongkorn, expressed his distaste of the waste of labour and money, and ordered that a simple structure be built for his cremation instead. Since then, royal funerals have employed such simplified designs for the merumat and men, and the terms are now only used to distinguish the rank of the deceased.

Following cremation, the merumat or men is disassembled and the components and materials are usually donated to Buddhist temples or to charity. Materials from the men of Prince Siriraj Kakudhabhand in 1888, for example, were used to build Siriraj Hospital.

Royal funeral chariots

As the merumat is being built, restoration and maintenance work is also done to prepare the royal funeral chariots for the cremation ceremony procession, and practice sessions are held.

Prior to cremation
A few days prior to the cremation ceremony, phusa mala officials will remove the body from the kot in order to remove the materials used during sukam sop, and re-wrap the body in a new shroud. In the past, the partially-decomposed flesh would also be removed and stripped from the bones, in order to be cremated separately, but embalming has rendered this process unnecessary. (This was not done for recent royal funerals where the body was placed in a coffin; the last time this ceremony happened was prior to the 2012 royal cremation of Princess Bejaratana.)

Sometimes, however, the body might actually be moved from its place of enshrinement before the morning of the procession, in an unofficial step that is not part of the ceremonies. "stealing of the body"). This is done out of necessity or for convenience, e.g. in cases where the site is far from the procession route, or, in modern times, where body is placed in a coffin rather than the kot. It is an old tradition dating back to the Ayutthaya kings which saves time for the royal funeral procession within hours.

Cremation ceremony

The royal cremation ceremonies were historically elaborate and celebratory events. Those for the king usually lasted fourteen days and nights, and included processions of relics of the Buddha, fireworks, and days of festivities. Today, it usually lasts about five days, and mainly consists of funeral processions bringing the royal body to the merumat or men, the cremation, and processions returning the cremated remains and ashes to the palace. This section will describe the current rituals for the highest-ranking royals (those held in Sanam Luang), and use merumat to refer to both merumat or men, for simplicity.

Funeral processions

Final Buddhist rites are held in the evening before the cremation ceremony. The following morning, the kot carrying the royal remains is carried to the merumat via a series of funeral processions.

It is then carried from Dusit Maha Prasat Throne Hall, out of the Grand Palace, and to the front of Wat Pho, where it is transferred to the royal funeral chariot (either the Maha Phichai Ratcharot or Vejayanta Ratcharot). The second procession—the most elaborate—then proceeds towards and enters Sanam Luang, where the kot is transferred either again to Phra Yannamat Sam Lam Khan, or to a royal gun carriage (for kings who held the title of Head of the Armed Forces or royal family members holding high military ranks in the Royal Thai Armed Forces, a tradition initiated on the wishes of King Vajiravudh in 1926). The third procession then circumambulates the merumat three times in a counter-clockwise fashion, before the kot is brought into the merumat. During the processions, ceremonial music is played, and gun salutes are fired.

Cremation
Further Buddhist rites are held, until the cremation takes place in the evening.

During the first cremation, which is a mock ceremonial burning, the king lights the cremation fire and lays the first —artificial flowers made of sandalwood and used ceremonially in cremations. The other guests then follow suit, laying flowers one by one. The ritual is repeated later in the night, with a smaller group of guests, when the actual cremation takes place. On the first lighting a 21-gun salute and a three-volley salute are both fired in the Sanam Luang field.

Interment of remains and ashes

The day after the cremation, a ceremony takes place where the cremated remains and ashes are viewed and placed in smaller urns. They are then transported back to the Grand Palace in a fourth procession after a morning service and breakfast by the monks. The remains are brought into the Dusit Maha Prasat Throne Hall, while the ashes are temporarily placed in the Phra Si Rattana Chedi stupa in Wat Phra Kaew.

The next day, final Buddhist rites are held for the cremated remains in the morning, before the kot is transported the short distance to Chakri Maha Prasat Throne Hall, where the remains will be interred, in the fifth procession. The sixth procession carries the royal ashes to the temple where they will be interred, usually at Wat Ratchabophit, where the Royal Cemetery is located, unlike the five past processions in current royal funerals the ashes are transported to the interment site in a royal automobile with escorts provided by the 29th Cavalry Squadron, Royal Horse Guards.

Entertainment
Entertainments and theatrical performances used to feature largely during royal cremation ceremonies, but were discontinued during the funeral of King Chulalongkorn. The practice was revived, at the suggestion of Princess Sirindhorn, during the funeral of Princess Mother Srinagarindra in 1996.

Modern developments

As an ongoing tradition, royal funerals have undergone changes and adaptations throughout the years. Much of the ceremony has been simplified since the funeral of King Chulalongkorn, and the development of embalming has changed the body-handling process. Recent developments introduced in the late twentieth century include live television broadcasts of the ceremony, as well as increased public participation. The public was first allowed to symbolically participate in the royal bathing ceremony in front of royal portraits during the funeral of Princess Mother Srinagarindra, and was allowed to co-host the funeral rites in the funeral of Princess Galyani Vadhana in 2008. The phra kot chan of Queen Rambai Barni and Princess Bejaratana have also been preserved, along with the phra kot chan and phra hip chan of Princess Mother Srinagarindra, Princess Galyani Vadhana and King Bhumibol Adulyadej, instead of being burnt in the pyre. Electric furnaces were introduced in the cremation ceremonies of Princess Galyani Vadhana.

Related traditions
Similar royal funerary traditions are observed in Cambodia and, historically, in Laos, as the countries historically shared the same cultural sphere as Thailand. In Cambodia, the late King Norodom Sihanouk received a royal cremation in 2013, more than 50 years after the ceremony was last held. The last royal cremation to take place in Laos was that of King Sisavang Vong in 1961; the country was later taken over by the Communists, and its last king, Sisavang Vatthana, died in captivity.

Galleries

Royal crematoria

Processions

Phra Merumat of King Bhumibol Adulyadej (2017)

Glossary

This glossary provides spellings, pronunciations, and definitions of the Thai terms used in this article. Formatting of the glossary is shown in the following example entry:

The Thai language uses a special register, known as rachasap, to address royalty. These are usually indicated by the prefixes phra and boromma. For example, a  
() used for royalty is referred to as phra kot, and one used for the king or queen is referred to as phra boromma kot. In the following entries, an asterisk (*) denotes royal terms used for the king or queen.

Notes

References

Further reading

 
 

Royal Funeral
Royal Funeral
Royal Funeral
+Thai